Dorothy Black may refer to:

Dorothy Black (novelist) (1890–1977), British romance novelist
Dorothy Black (actress) (1899–1985), South African-British actress
Dorothy Black (translator) (1914–2004), South African translator and agent